is a private university headquartered in Shinagawa, Tokyo, Japan.

The university offers health professional education programs in undergraduate and graduate levels.

History 
The predecessor of the university, Aobagakuen Junior College, was established as a women's two-year junior college in 1966. It became coeducational in 2001 and it was reorganized into a four-year university in 2005.

Campuses 

 Gotanda Campus: Higashigotanda, Shinagawa, Tokyo
 Setagaya Campus: Setagaya, Tokyo
  Campus: Meguro, Tokyo
 National Hospital Organization Tachikawa Campus: Tachikawa, Tokyo
 Funabashi Campus: Funabashi City, Chiba Prefecture
 Onominato Campus: Wakayama City, Wakayama Prefecture
  Campus: Wakayama City, Wakayama Prefecture

Organization

Undergraduate schools 
The university has five divisions of nursing. Their entrance examinations and educations are conducted separately.
 Faculty of Healthcare: Gotanda and Setagaya Campus
 Division of Nursing
 Division of Medical Nutrition
 Division of Healthcare Informatics
 Higashigaoka Faculty of Nursing: National Hospital Organization Campus
 Division of Nursing
 Tachikawa Faculty of Nursing: National Hospital Organization Tachikawa Campus
 Division of Nursing
 Chiba Faculty of Nursing: Funabashi Campus
 Division of Nursing
 Wakayama Faculty of Nursing: Onominato and Japanese Red Cross Wakayama Medical Center Campus
 Division of Nursing
 Department of Midwifery (one-year program): Gotanda Campus

Graduate schools 
 Postgraduate School of Healthcare: Gotanda Campus
 Postgraduate School of Nursing: National Hospital Organization Campus
 Wakayama Postgraduate School of Nursing: Japanese Red Cross Wakayama Medical Center Campus
 Chiba Postgraduate School of Nursing: Funabashi Campus

External links 
 TOKYO HEALTHCARE UNIVERSITY

References 

Educational institutions established in 2005
Private universities and colleges in Japan
Universities and colleges in Tokyo
Universities and colleges in Chiba Prefecture
Universities and colleges in Wakayama Prefecture
2005 establishments in Japan